États d'amour is francophone Canadian pop singer Isabelle Boulay's second studio album.  It was released in Quebec in February 1998 and in France in November 1998, with a somewhat different sequence of tracks.  Also, a limited edition was issued consisting of the French release together with a bonus mini-CD.

Track listing (Canadian release)
 "Je t'oublierai, je t'oublierai" (Lyrics: Luc Plamondon, music: Richard Cocciante)
 "Le banc des délaissés" (Zachary Richard) 
 "Les yeux au ciel" (Lyrics: Damien Ruzé, music: Jacques Romenski)
 "J'ai mal à l'amour" (Mario Peluso)
 "L'héroïne de cette histoire" (Zazie) 
 "N'oubliez jamais" (Lyrics: Jim Cregan, music: Russ Kunkel)
 "État d'amour" (Lyrics: Roger Tabra, music: France D'Amour)
 "La lune"  (Lyrics: Christian Mistral, music: Mario Peluso)
 "Tombée de toi" (France D'Amour, Roger Tabra)
 "L'amour dans l'âme" (Zazie) 
 "Le saule" (Lyrics: Francis Basset, music: Franck Langolff)
 "Homme sweet homme" (Zazie)
 "T'es pas mon fils" (Michel Barbeau)
 "C'était l'hiver" (Francis Cabrel)
 "L'hymne à la beauté du monde" (Lyrics: Luc Plamondon, music: Christian St-Roch)
 "Blanche comme la neige"

Track listing (French release)
 "Je t'oublierai, Je t'oublierai" (Lyrics: Luc Plamondon, music: Richard Cocciante) — 3:31
 "État d'amour" (Lyrics: Roger Tabra, music: France D'Amour) — 4:06
 "Le saule" (Lyrics: Francis Basset, music: Franck Langolff) — 5:26
 "L'héroïne de cette histoire" (Zazie) — 4:29
 "La lune" (Lyrics: Christian Mistral, music: Mario Peluso) — 3:44
 "N'oubliez jamais" (Lyrics: Jim Cregan, music: Russ Kunkel) — 4:15
 "L'amour dans l'âme" (Zazie) — 4:47
 "Les yeux au ciel" (Lyrics: Damien Ruzé, music: Jacques Romenski) — 4:26
 "T'es pas mon fils" (Michel Barbeau) — 2:42
 "C'était l'hiver" (Francis Cabrel) — 4:07
 "Le banc des délaissés" (Zachary Richard) — 4:57

Bonus mini-CD
This was recorded at the Théâtre Saint-Denis during the FrancoFolies de Montréal.
 "D'aventures en aventures" (with Serge Lama)
 "Amsterdam"
 "La Ballade de Jean Batailleur"

Charts

Certifications

References

1998 albums
Isabelle Boulay albums
V2 Records albums